George Curry is the name of:

George Law Curry (1820–1878), U.S. politician
S. George Curry (1854–1942), Canadian architect
George Curry (politician) (1861–1947), Governor of New Mexico Territory and U.S. Representative
George Curry (Wild Bunch) (1871–1900), American robber of the American Old West
George Curry (baseball) (1888–1963), Major League Baseball pitcher
George Curry (American football) (1944–2016), former American football coach
George E. Curry (1947–2016), journalist, speaker and media coach
Rube Curry (George Reuben Curry, 1898–1966), American baseball player

See also
George Currie (disambiguation)